The Zipser Mühlbach is a small river in Bavaria, Germany. It flows into the Fichtenohe north of the town Pegnitz.

See also
List of rivers of Bavaria

References

Rivers of Bavaria
Rivers of Germany